Toshiei is a masculine Japanese given name.

Possible writings
Toshiei can be written using different combinations of kanji characters. Some examples:

敏英, "agile, hero"
敏栄, "agile, prosperity"
敏映, "agile, reflect"
敏瑛, "agile, crystal"
敏永, "agile, eternity"
敏衛, "agile, defense"
俊英, "talented, hero"
俊栄, "talented, prosperity"
俊映, "talented, reflect"
俊瑛, "talented, crystal"
俊永, "talented, eternity"
俊衛, "talented, defense"
利英, "benefit, hero"
利栄, "benefit, prosperity"
利映, "benefit, reflect"
利瑛, "benefit, crystal"
年英, "year, hero"
年栄, "year, prosperity"
寿英, "long life, hero"
寿栄, "long life, prosperity"

The name can also be written in hiragana としえい or katakana トシエイ.

Notable people with the name
, Japanese ice hockey player.
, Japanese labor activist and politician.
, Japanese politician.

Japanese masculine given names